Australoplax tridentata, commonly known as the furry-clawed crab  or tuxedo shore crab  is a species of crab in the family Macrophthalmidae that is found in Queensland, New South Wales and the Northern Territory.

Description 
Claws are blue. Adult males have large claws, adult females small claws. Adult males have a patch of fur at the base of the fingers. The carapace breadth is up to 15 mm. It lives in mangroves and muddy creek banks.

References

External links 

 Video of Australoplax tridentata feeding on YouTube

Ocypodoidea
Crustaceans described in 1873